Neotrops is a genus of spiders in the family Oonopidae. It was first described in 2013 by Grismado & Ramírez. , it contains 28 species.

Species
Neotrops comprises the following species:
 Neotrops amacuro Grismado & Ramírez, 2013 — Venezuela
 Neotrops avalosi Grismado & Ramírez, 2013 — Paraguay, Argentina
 Neotrops caparu Grismado & Ramírez, 2013 — Colombia
 Neotrops darwini Grismado & Ramírez, 2013 (type) — Argentina, Uruguay
 Neotrops donaldi (Chickering, 1951) — Panama
 Neotrops izquierdoi Grismado & Ramírez, 2013 — Bolivia
 Neotrops kopuchianae Grismado & Ramírez, 2013 — Bolivia
 Neotrops labarquei Grismado & Ramírez, 2013 — Uruguay
 Neotrops lopardoae Grismado & Ramírez, 2013 — Argentina
 Neotrops lorenae Grismado & Ramírez, 2013 — Argentina, Uruguay
 Neotrops maracay Grismado & Ramírez, 2013 — Venezuela
 Neotrops nigromaculatus (Mello-Leitão, 1944) — Argentina, Uruguay
 Neotrops pakitza Grismado & Ramírez, 2013 — Peru
 Neotrops piacentinii Grismado & Ramírez, 2013 — Argentina
 Neotrops pithecia Grismado & Ramírez, 2013 — Peru
 Neotrops platnicki Grismado & Ramírez, 2013 — Ecuador
 Neotrops poguazu Grismado & Ramírez, 2013 — Argentina
 Neotrops pombero Grismado & Ramírez, 2013 — Paraguay, Argentina
 Neotrops ramirezi Izquierdo & Grismado, 2014 — Colombia
 Neotrops rubioi Grismado & Ramírez, 2013 — Paraguay, Argentina
 Neotrops santamarta Grismado & Ramírez, 2013 — Colombia
 Neotrops sciosciae Grismado & Ramírez, 2013 — Argentina, Uruguay
 Neotrops silvae Grismado & Ramírez, 2013 — Peru
 Neotrops trapellus (Chickering, 1970) — Trinidad, Venezuela
 Neotrops tucumanus (Simon, 1907) — Argentina
 Neotrops waorani Grismado & Ramírez, 2013 — Ecuador
 Neotrops yabare Grismado & Ramírez, 2013 — Bolivia
 Neotrops yunga Grismado & Ramírez, 2013 — Argentina

References

Oonopidae
Araneomorphae genera
Spiders of Central America
Spiders of South America